Aschegul is a rural locality (a selo) and the administrative center of Aschegulsky Selsoviet of Mikhaylovsky District, Altai Krai, Russia. The population was 359 in 2016. There are 7 streets.

Geography 
Aschegul is located 40 km north of Mikhaylovskoye (the district's administrative centre) by road. Poluyamki is the nearest rural locality.

References 

Rural localities in Mikhaylovsky District, Altai Krai